Bayfield is a local service district in Westmorland County, New Brunswick, Canada, near the intersection of Route 955 and Route 16.

History

Located on the Northumberland Strait, 2.57 km W of Cape Tormentine: Botsford Parish, Westmorland County: named for Admiral Henry Wolsey-Bayfield (1795-1885), who was responsible for surveying much of the New Brunswick, Nova Scotia and Prince Edward Island coastline in the 1840s and 1850s: PO from 1866: in 1871 it had a population of 175: in 1898 Bayfield was a farming settlement with 1 post office, 2 stores, 1 hotel, 1 carriage factory, 1 church and a population of 200: by 1904 the population had increased to 300.

Notable people

George Allen - Hockey Player
Jim Riley - Hockey Player
Viv Allen - Hockey Player

See also
List of communities in New Brunswick

References

Communities in Westmorland County, New Brunswick
Designated places in New Brunswick
Local service districts of Westmorland County, New Brunswick